Walkersteel is a major steel processing company based in Blackburn, Lancashire. The firm was originally established by Charles Walker before his son Jack Walker turned the business into a major company.

The company was sold to British Steel plc in 1989 for a fee in excess of £300million - which helped fund Jack Walker's takeover of Blackburn Rovers in early 1991. By this time, the steel company was achieving profits worth close to £50million a year, though the onset of the recession saw the steel market suffer a major slump.

The brand was revived following Jack Walker's death but is linked in name only.

External links
Official Website
Steel Express Limited

Companies based in Blackburn
Steel companies of the United Kingdom